Cózar is a municipality in Ciudad Real, Castile-La Mancha, Spain. It has a population of 1,260.

References

External links
 .

Municipalities in the Province of Ciudad Real